Rie Sato may refer to:

, Japanese ice hockey player
, Japanese softball player
, Japanese speed skater